The Henry D. and Juliana (Wortz) Albright House, also known as the Dr. Francis F. and Jeanette L. Ebersole House, is a historic building located in Mount Vernon, Iowa, United States. It is significant for its association with the settlement of the city that was influenced by the establishment of the Military Road, as the first brick house constructed in Mount Vernon, and its vernacular architectural techniques. Henry D. Albright, a carpenter, and his brother William, a mason, came from Iowa City to Mount Vernon to work on building Cornell College. William established a brickyard in town and he helped his brother Henry build this house in 1853. Henry and his wife Juliana and their family were the first to live here. The family owned the house until 1926. Dr. F.F. Ebersole acquired the house that year and completed renovations to the house the following year to include his medical practice in his home. The two-story, side-gabled brick house features Early Republic stylistic influences. Locally made brick from the Albright brickyard and locally quarried limestone was used in its construction. The house was listed on the National Register of Historic Places in 2020.

References

Houses completed in 1853
Vernacular architecture in Iowa
Houses in Mount Vernon, Iowa
National Register of Historic Places in Linn County, Iowa
Houses on the National Register of Historic Places in Iowa